Washington Township, Oklahoma may refer to the following places:

Washington Township, Garfield County, Oklahoma
Washington Township, Grady County, Oklahoma
Washington Township, Love County, Oklahoma

See also

Washington Township (disambiguation)

Oklahoma township disambiguation pages